Exidia is a genus of fungi in the family Auriculariaceae. The species are saprotrophic, occurring in attached or recently fallen dead wood, and produce gelatinous basidiocarps (fruit bodies). The fruit bodies are diverse, pustular, lobed, button-shaped or cup-shaped. Several species, including the type species Exidia glandulosa, have sterile pegs or pimples on their spore-bearing surface. The genus has a cosmopolitan distribution and around 20 species are currently recognized worldwide. Initial molecular research indicates the genus is artificial.

Taxonomy
Exidia species were originally placed in the genus Tremella along with many other gelatinous fungi. The genus Exidia was separated from Tremella by Fries in 1822, based mainly on fruit body shape. Fries initially included species now assigned to Auricularia within the genus.

Recent molecular research has indicated that Exidia as currently circumscribed is an artificial grouping, the species not being clearly differentiated from similar, but effused species assigned to the genera Exidiopsis and Heterochaete. Only a few species have yet been sequenced, however.

Description
Exidia fruit bodies are gelatinous, most having a distinct spore-bearing upper surface and a sterile undersurface. These surfaces are either smooth or (in some species) covered in dense or scattered sterile pegs or pimples. Fruit bodies grow either separately or in clusters, in which case they may coalesce.

Microscopic characters
Exidia fruit bodies are composed of hyphae with clamp connections in a gelatinous matrix. The spore-bearing surface is initially covered in a layer of branched hyphidia below which the basidia are formed. The basidia are tremelloid (ellipsoid and vertically septate), giving rise to long, sinuous sterigmata or epibasidia on which the basidiospores are produced. These spores are allantoid (sausage-shaped) or less commonly oblong to cylindrical.

Representative species

Exidia aeruginosa
Exidia alveolata
Exidia cartilaginea
Exidia glandulosa (synonym E. truncata)
Exidia japonica
Exidia nigricans (synonym E. plana)
Exidia novozealandica
Exidia pithya
Exidia pusilla
Exidia recisa
Exidia repanda
Exidia saccharina
Exidia thuretiana

References

Auriculariales
Agaricomycetes genera